The 2019 South American Cricket Championship was a cricket tournament held in Lima, Peru from 3 to 6 October 2019. A men's and women's tournament was held, with 2019 being the sixteenth edition of the men's South American Cricket Championship and the ninth edition of the women's event. Most matches played at the 2018 women's championship were granted Twenty20 International (T20I) status, and 2019 was the first time that matches in the men's event were eligible for T20I status, since the ICC granted Twenty20 International (T20I) status to matches between all of its Members. Mexico were the defending men's champions, while Brazil won the 2018 women's event.

Brazil retained the women's title with a 100% records during the tournament, including a four-wicket win against Argentina in the final.

Participating teams

Men:

Women:

Men's championship

The seven participating teams were the national sides of Peru, Argentina, Brazil, Chile, Colombia, Mexico and Uruguay. Colombia and Uruguay were not Associate Members of the ICC and so matches involving either of these teams did not have T20I status.

Points table

Final

Women's championship

The five participating teams were the national women's sides of Peru, Argentina, Brazil, Chile and Mexico. All of these teams were Associate Members of the ICC and so all matches had WT20I status, subject to player-eligibility criteria.

Points table

Final

References

Associate international cricket competitions in 2019–20
International cricket competitions in Peru
South American Cricket Championship
South American Cricket Championship